The 2004–05 Philadelphia Flyers season was the Flyers' 38th season in the National Hockey League (NHL), however its games were canceled due to the 2004–05 NHL lockout. The other 29 teams did not play either due to the labor dispute.

Off-season

After being defeated in the seventh game of the 2004 Eastern Conference Finals by the eventual Stanley Cup champion Tampa Bay Lightning, the Flyers prepared for the looming labor uncertainty associated with the impending expiration of the existing NHL Collective Bargaining Agreement. While team captain Keith Primeau was re-signed to a four-year contract worth $17 million prior to hitting the free agent market, leading scorer Mark Recchi was not – general manager Bob Clarke said he would not re-sign Recchi until a new collective bargaining agreement was in place – and instead signed with the Pittsburgh Penguins on July 9. Contract offers were made to impending unrestricted free agents Vladimir Malakhov and Alexei Zhamnov, key acquisitions during the final quarter of the 2003–04 regular season, but the Flyers were unable to come to terms with either player.

Unsigned 2001 first-round draft pick R. J. Umberger, whose NHL rights had previously been held by the Vancouver Canucks and New York Rangers, signed with the Flyers as an unrestricted free agent on June 16. The Flyers signed free agent right wingers Mike Knuble of the Boston Bruins and Turner Stevenson of the New Jersey Devils to three-year contracts after the free agency period began. On July 13 undrafted free agent forward Tony Voce, who played four seasons at Boston College, became the first native of Philadelphia to sign with the Flyers.

Schedule
The Flyers preseason and regular season schedules were announced on July 14, 2004.

|-
| 1 || September 23 || @ Washington Capitals
|-
| 2 || September 30 || Washington Capitals
|-
| 3 || October 2 || @ New York Islanders
|-
| 4 || October 5 || New York Islanders
|-
| 5 || October 6 || New Jersey Devils
|-
| 6 || October 9 || @ New Jersey Devils
|-
| colspan="6" style="text-align:center;"|
Notes:
 Neutral site game which was scheduled to be played at the Giant Center in Hershey, Pennsylvania
|-

|-
| 1 || October 13 || @ Tampa Bay Lightning
|-
| 2 || October 14 || @ Florida Panthers
|-
| 3 || October 16 || @ Montreal Canadiens
|-
| 4 || October 20 || @ New York Rangers
|-
| 5 || October 21 || Carolina Hurricanes
|-
| 6 || October 23 || @ Ottawa Senators
|-
| 7 || October 25 || Chicago Blackhawks
|-
| 8 || October 28 || Montreal Canadiens
|-
| 9 || November 2 || New Jersey Devils
|-
| 10 || November 5 || @ Buffalo Sabres
|-
| 11 || November 6 || @ Washington Capitals
|-
| 12 || November 8 || St. Louis Blues
|-
| 13 || November 11 || Boston Bruins
|-
| 14 || November 13 || @ Pittsburgh Penguins
|-
| 15 || November 17 || New York Islanders
|-
| 16 || November 19 || Carolina Hurricanes
|-
| 17 || November 20 || @ Toronto Maple Leafs
|-
| 18 || November 24 || @ Washington Capitals
|-
| 19 || November 26 || Atlanta Thrashers
|-
| 20 || November 27 || @ New York Islanders
|-
| 21 || November 30 || Tampa Bay Lightning
|-
| 22 || December 2 || New York Rangers
|-
| 23 || December 4 || Buffalo Sabres
|-
| 24 || December 7 || @ Nashville Predators
|-
| 25 || December 8 || @ Dallas Stars
|-
| 26 || December 10 || New York Islanders
|-
| 27 || December 13 || @ Ottawa Senators
|-
| 28 || December 15 || Boston Bruins
|-
| 29 || December 16 || @ Boston Bruins
|-
| 30 || December 18 || New York Rangers
|-
| 31 || December 21 || Florida Panthers
|-
| 32 || December 23 || @ Pittsburgh Penguins
|-
| 33 || December 27 || @ Vancouver Canucks
|-
| 34 || December 29 || @ Calgary Flames
|-
| 35 || December 30 || @ Edmonton Oilers
|-
| 36 || January 2 || @ Chicago Blackhawks
|-
| 37 || January 5 || @ Minnesota Wild
|-
| 38 || January 7 || @ Mighty Ducks of Anaheim
|-
| 39 || January 8 || @ Los Angeles Kings
|-
| 40 || January 12 || Phoenix Coyotes
|-
| 41 || January 14 || @ Carolina Hurricanes
|-
| 42 || January 15 || Buffalo Sabres
|-
| 43 || January 18 || @ New Jersey Devils
|-
| 44 || January 20 || Pittsburgh Penguins
|-
| 45 || January 22 || @ New York Rangers
|-
| 46 || January 24 || @ Washington Capitals
|-
| 47 || January 25 || Tampa Bay Lightning
|-
| 48 || January 29 || Atlanta Thrashers
|-
| 49 || February 1 || @ New York Islanders
|-
| 50 || February 3 || Mighty Ducks of Anaheim
|-
| 51 || February 5 || New Jersey Devils
|-
| 52 || February 8 || Los Angeles Kings
|-
| 53 || February 10 || San Jose Sharks
|-
| 54 || February 15 || @ Montreal Canadiens
|-
| 55 || February 17 || New Jersey Devils
|-
| 56 || February 19 || @ New York Rangers
|-
| 57 || February 20 || Montreal Canadiens
|-
| 58 || February 23 || @ Carolina Hurricanes
|-
| 59 || February 24 || Pittsburgh Penguins
|-
| 60 || February 26 || Colorado Avalanche
|-
| 61 || February 28 || Ottawa Senators
|-
| 62 || March 2 || @ Atlanta Thrashers
|-
| 63 || March 3 || Washington Capitals
|-
| 64 || March 5 || @ Boston Bruins
|-
| 65 || March 7 || @ New Jersey Devils
|-
| 66 || March 8 || @ Toronto Maple Leafs
|-
| 67 || March 10 || Toronto Maple Leafs
|-
| 68 || March 12 || Pittsburgh Penguins
|-
| 69 || March 15 || @ Florida Panthers
|-
| 70 || March 16 || @ Tampa Bay Lightning
|-
| 71 || March 19 || @ New Jersey Devils
|-
| 72 || March 21 || Columbus Blue Jackets
|-
| 73 || March 23 || @ Buffalo Sabres
|-
| 74 || March 24 || Ottawa Senators
|-
| 75 || March 26 || Toronto Maple Leafs
|-
| 76 || March 28 || New York Islanders
|-
| 77 || March 31 || @ Atlanta Thrashers
|-
| 78 || April 2 || @ Pittsburgh Penguins
|-
| 79 || April 3 || Detroit Red Wings
|-
| 80 || April 5 || Florida Panthers
|-
| 81 || April 7 || New York Rangers
|-
| 82 || April 9 || @ New York Islanders
|-

NHL lockout

The lockout started on September 16, 2004 and those Flyers with two-way contracts were sent down to the Phantoms. Those Flyers with NHL-only contracts either sat out or played in another league.

Player activity

The following is a list of Flyers with NHL-only contracts and whether they were active during the lockout. Vladimir Malakhov and Alexei Zhamnov are not included since their contracts expired prior to the lockout.

Farm teams

The Flyers were affiliated with the Philadelphia Phantoms of the American Hockey League (AHL) and the Trenton Titans of the ECHL. Both teams were their league's champions.

Philadelphia Phantoms
With the Flyers season canceled, many players who would normally be in orange and black were in purple, orange, and black instead. Joni Pitkanen and Todd Fedoruk had spent the entirety of the previous season with the Flyers and over a dozen others on the Phantoms roster had previously spent time in the NHL. Led by mid-season acquisition Jon Sim's 35 goals and R. J. Umberger's 65 points, the Phantoms finished second in their division with a record of 48–25–3–4. Reinforced by the arrivals of top junior prospects Jeff Carter and Mike Richards to the team, the Phantoms defeated the Norfolk Admirals in six games, the Wilkes-Barre/Scranton Penguins in five games, and the Providence Bruins in six games to reach the finals. Holding the Chicago Wolves to four goals the entire series, the Phantoms swept the series and won the Calder Cup. Goaltender Antero Niittymaki was awarded the Jack A. Butterfield Trophy as playoff MVP.

Trenton Titans
Trenton finished second in their division and after defeating the Atlantic City Boardwalk Bullies in three games, the Reading Royals in four games, and the Alaska Aces in seven games, the Titans defeated the Florida Everblades in six games to win the Kelly Cup.

Transactions
The Flyers were involved in the following transactions from June 8, 2004, the day after the deciding game of the 2004 Stanley Cup Finals, through February 16, 2005, the day the  season was officially canceled.

Trades

Players acquired

Players lost

Signings

Draft picks

Philadelphia's picks at the 2004 NHL Entry Draft, which was held at the RBC Center in Raleigh, North Carolina on June 26–27, 2004. The Flyers traded their first-round pick, 25th overall, their 2005 third-round pick, and Jeff Woywitka to the Edmonton Oilers for Mike Comrie on December 16, 2003. The Flyers also traded their originally allotted second, fifth, sixth, and seventh-round draft picks in three different trades.

Notes

References
General
 
Specific

Phil
Phil
Philadelphia Flyers seasons
Philadelphia
Philadelphia